Sidumo Shongwe (born 27 June 1981) is a Liswati former footballer who played for Manzini Wanderers and the Eswatini national team.

References

External links
 
 

1981 births
Eswatini international footballers
living people
Manzini Wanderers F.C. players
Swazi footballers